Ammonium hydrogen fluoride is the inorganic compound with the formula  or . It is produced from ammonia and hydrogen fluoride. This colourless salt is a glass-etchant and an intermediate in a once-contemplated route to hydrofluoric acid.

Structure 
Ammonium bifluoride, as its name indicates, contains an ammonium cation, and a bifluoride or hydrogen(difluoride) anion. The centrosymmetric triatomic bifluoride anion features the strongest known hydrogen bond, with a F−H length of 114 pm. and a bond energy greater than 155 kJ/mol.

In solid , each ammonium cation is surrounded by four fluoride centers in a tetrahedron, with hydrogen-fluorine hydrogen bonds present between the hydrogen atoms of the ammonium ion and the fluorine atoms. Solutions contain tetrahedral [[ammonium| cations and linear  anions.

Production and applications 
Ammonium bifluoride is a component of some etchants. It attacks silica component of glass:

Potassium bifluoride is a related more commonly used etchant.

Ammonium bifluoride has been considered as an intermediate in the production of hydrofluoric acid from hexafluorosilicic acid. Thus, hexafluorosilicic acid is hydrolyzed to give ammonium fluoride, which thermally decomposes to give the bifluoride:

The resulting ammonium bifluoride is converted to sodium bifluoride, which thermally decomposes to release HF.

Ammonium bifluoride is also used as an additive in tin-nickel plating processes as the fluoride ion acts as a complexing agent with the tin, allowing for greater control over the resulting composition and finish.

Toxicity 
Ammonium bifluoride is toxic to consume and a skin corrosion agent. Upon exposure to skin, rinsing with water followed by a treatment of calcium gluconate is required. In water, ammonium bifluoride exists in chemical equilibrium with hydrofluoric acid and heating releases hydrogen fluoride gas. Consequently, there is an equivalent toxicological risk as is present with hydrofluoric acid, and the same safety precautions apply.

Ammonium bifluoride is used in some automotive wheel cleaning products. Many injuries have resulted in users not being aware of the risks posed by the products. Ammonium bifluoride based products are often considered a safer alternative to hydrofluoric acid, yet still pose clear risks to the handler.  Ammonium bifluoride, ammonium fluoride, and hydrofluoric acid have been described as "too dangerous for any use in a car wash environment" by Professional Car Washing and Detailing magazine, advice that accords with a 2015 report from the U.S. Centers for Disease Control and Prevention.

References 

Nonmetal halides
Ammonium compounds
Deliquescent substances
Bifluorides